The Koporin Monastery is a monastery at the outskirts of the town of Velika Plana, Serbia, just off the road to Smederevska Palanka. The monastery church, dedicated to the St. Stephen, was built during the reign of Despot Stefan Lazarević (1389–1427) whose portrait is preserved as a fresco inside the church, under the inscription "Despot". Stefan Lazarević acquired this title after the Battle of Ankara in 1402, and on that basis paintings was dated. Ktetor and exact time of monastery founding is unknown. Stefan Lazarević is buried in this church. Monastery was in the dilapidated state until the 1880, when first reconstruction  started. In the late fifties and the sixties of 20th century, massive conservation of architectural elements and paintings was finished.

Koporin Monastery was declared Monument of Culture of Great Importance in 1979, and it is protected by Republic of Serbia.

See also 
 Tourism in Serbia

References

External links 

 Secrets of Koporin Despot St. Stephen (Church, no. 945-946, August 1, 2006).

 

15th-century Serbian Orthodox church buildings
Christian monasteries established in the 15th century
Medieval Serbian Orthodox monasteries
Cultural Monuments of Great Importance (Serbia)
Burial sites of the Lazarević dynasty
Serbian Orthodox monasteries in Serbia
15th-century establishments in Serbia